United States war plans may refer to:
 United States color-coded war plans,  potential U.S. strategies for a variety of hypothetical war scenarios developed during the 1920s and 1930s
 United States war plans (1945–1950)